Arthur Stanley Goldberger (November 20, 1930 – December 11, 2009) was an econometrician and an economist.  He worked with Nobel Prize winner Lawrence Klein on the development of the Klein–Goldberger macroeconomic model at the University of Michigan.

He spent most of his career at the University of Wisconsin–Madison, where he helped build the Department of Economics.  He wrote classic graduate and undergraduate econometrics textbooks, including Econometric Theory (1964),  A Course in Econometrics (1991) and Introductory Econometrics (1998). Among his many accomplishments, he published a number of articles critically evaluating the literature on the heritability of IQ and other behavioral traits.

In 1968 he was elected as a Fellow of the American Statistical Association.

Selected publications 

 (1964) Goldberger and Lawrence Klein. Econometric Model of the U. S., Nineteen Twenty-Nine to Nineteen Fifty-Two.
 (1964) Goldberger. Econometric Theory (Wiley Publications in Applied Statistics) .John Wiley & Sons Inc.. .
 (1970) Goldberger. Impact Multipliers and Dynamic Properties of the Klein-Goldberger Model (Contributions to Economic Analysis). North-Holland Publishing Company. .
 (1981) Goldberger. A Course in Econometrics. Harvard University Press. .

References

Sources

External links

 Charles F. Manski, "Arthur S. Goldberger", Biographical Memoirs of the National Academy of Sciences (2013)

1930 births
2009 deaths
University of Michigan alumni
Members of the United States National Academy of Sciences
Econometricians
21st-century American economists
20th-century American economists
University of Michigan faculty
Fellows of the American Statistical Association
Fellows of the Econometric Society
Members of the Royal Netherlands Academy of Arts and Sciences
Distinguished Fellows of the American Economic Association